Belloc is a commune in the Ariège department of southwestern France.

It is located between Mirepoix and Foix and sits in the midst of a vast agricultural area.

Cuisine
The region features a robust cuisine including cassoulet and confit de canard and wines including the corbieres, minervois and malepere. The semi-hard ewe's milk cheese Abbaye de Belloc was first made here in the monastery of Notre-Dame de Belloc.

Population
Inhabitants of Belloc are called Bellocois.

See also
Communes of the Ariège department

References

Communes of Ariège (department)